SuperPlus Food Stores was an American discount supermarket chain that operated in the Chicago area during the 1980s until it was sold, piecemeal, by its parent company, The Great Atlantic & Pacific Tea Company (A&P).

References 

Defunct companies based in Chicago
Companies established in the 1980s
Companies disestablished in the 1980s
Defunct companies based in Illinois
Defunct supermarkets of the United States
The Great Atlantic & Pacific Tea Company
1980s establishments in Illinois
1980s disestablishments in Illinois